Élisabeth-Antoinette-Catherine Armand, later Élisabeth-Antoinette-Catherine de Saulces de Freycinet (1756–1814) was a French pastellist.

Born in Crest, Drôme, Armand was the daughter of Claude Armand. As a child she evinced great talent as a producer of pastels, drawing a number of members of her family, as well as a self-portrait, when she was fifteen years old; today several of these may be seen in the musée de Valence. In 1776 she married the Montélimar merchant Pierre-Louis de Saulces de Freycinet (1751–1827), whose family included among its members two explorers and a member of the Académie française. It is not known whether or not she continued her artistic activities after this point. She died in Montélimar.

References

1756 births
1814 deaths
French women painters
18th-century French painters
18th-century French women artists
Pastel artists
People from Montélimar